Vennesla Tidende (The Vennesla Times) is a local Norwegian newspaper published in Vennesla in Vest-Agder county. The newspaper was launched in 1989 and is published twice a week. It is edited by Christopher Johansen.

Circulation
According to the Norwegian Audit Bureau of Circulations and National Association of Local Newspapers, Vennesla Tidende has had the following annual circulation:
 2006: 3,021
 2007: 3,118
 2008: 3,107
 2009: 3,033
 2010: 2,988
 2011: 3,053
 2012: 2,958
 2013: 2,941
 2014: 2,916
 2015: 3,122
 2016: 2,948

References

External links
Vennesla Tidende homepage

Newspapers published in Norway
Norwegian-language newspapers
Vennesla
Mass media in Vest-Agder
Newspapers established in 1989
1989 establishments in Norway